Kiss Konfidential is a music VHS by American hard rock band Kiss released on August 16, 1993. The video features 13 live performances and also features backstage interviews from their Revenge Tour. There is also a variety of vintage clips from the 1970s.

The video has been praised as it features backstage footage of the band on the road, and shows what it takes to make one of KISS's shows come to life. It was certified Gold in the US.

Track listing

Personnel
Paul Stanley – rhythm guitar, vocals
Gene Simmons – bass guitar, vocals
Bruce Kulick – lead guitar and backing vocals on all tracks except 6–9
Eric Singer – drums and backing vocals on all tracks except 6–9
Ace Frehley – lead guitar and backing vocals on tracks 6–9
Peter Criss – drums and backing vocals on tracks 6–9

Certifications

References

External links
 Kiss Online

Kiss (band) video albums
Live video albums
1993 video albums
1993 live albums